The 2008 European Junior Championship was the fourth instance of the European Junior Championship. It was held from July 12–20 in Sevilla, Spain.

Participants

Matches

Group A

Group B

7th place

5th place

3rd place

Final

All-Star team
Offense

  #7  QB Anders Hermodsson
  #6  RB Hampus Hellermark
  #22 RB Alexey Medvedev
  #11 WR Daniel Belsbo 
  #9  WR Mickael Doukoure 
  #7  WR Kevin Narthey 
  #57 OL Mathias Franzén 
  #70 OL Nils Hampel 
  #61 OL Alexander Milanovic 
  #72 OL Alexander Bodewig
  #59 OL Clement Rabache

Defense

  #41 DL Rasmus Andersen 
  #99 DL Olof Flenström  
  #95 DL Kirill Zunin 
  #98 DL Paco Varol 
  #2  LB Niklas Frausing 
  #54 LB Ramiz Dadashev 
  #27 LB Marku Greber 
  #24 DB Loris Legras 
  #24 DB Aleksander Niemas 
  #26 DB Kristian Warthoe 
  #16 DB Alexander Gureev
 Tournament MVP :   #6 Hampus Hellermark

External links
 2008 European Junior Championship

2008
2008 in American football
2008 in Spanish sport
International sports competitions hosted by Spain
Sports competitions in Seville
American football in Spain
21st century in Seville